Popovka is a rural locality (a selo) and the administrative center of Popovskoye Rural Settlement, Korochansky District, Belgorod Oblast, Russia. The population was 1,300 as of 2010. There are 10 streets.

Geography 
Popovka is located 11 km north of Korocha (the district's administrative centre) by road. Krucheny is the nearest rural locality.

References 

Rural localities in Korochansky District
Korochansky Uyezd